The Universe in a Nutshell is a 2001 book about theoretical physics by Stephen Hawking. It is generally considered a sequel and was created to update the public concerning developments since the multi-million-copy bestseller A Brief History of Time was published in 1988.

Content
In it Hawking explains to a general audience various matters relating to the Lucasian professor's work, such as Gödel's Incompleteness Theorem and P-branes (part of superstring theory in quantum mechanics). He tells the history and principles of modern physics. He seeks to "combine Einstein's General Theory of Relativity and Richard Feynman's idea of multiple histories into one complete unified theory that will describe everything that happens in the universe."

Awards
The Universe in a Nutshell is winner of the Aventis Prizes for Science Books 2002.

See also 
 Roger Penrose
 Kip Thorne
 Physical cosmology
 Positivism
 List of textbooks on classical and quantum mechanics
List of books on general relativity

References 

2001 books
Popular physics books
Books by Stephen Hawking
Cosmology books
Bantam Spectra books